Ivan Ljubičić was the defending champion, but lost in the semifinals to Stanislas Wawrinka.

Third-seeded Andy Murray won in the final 6–4, 4–6, 6–2, against unseeded Stanislas Wawrinka.

Seeds

Draw

Finals

Top half

Bottom half

External links
 Draw
 Qualifying draw

2008 Qatar Open